The following is a list of municipalities of Angola, grouped by province.

Angola contains 18 províncias (provinces) which are divided into 164 municípios (translated as either municipality or city council), and these are further sub-divided into 559 comunas (communes). The two most recently created municipalities are Quilamba Quiaxi and Talatona in 2016.

See also
 Provinces of Angola

References

Angola, Municipalities
Angola
Municipalities
Municipalities, Angola